Satyarth Prakash (– "The Light of Meaning of the Truth" or The Light of Truth) is an 1875 book written originally in Hindi by Dayanand Saraswati (Swami Dayanand), a religious and social reformer and the founder of Arya Samaj. The book was subsequently revised by Swami Dayanand Saraswati in 1882 and has been translated into more than 20 languages including Sanskrit and foreign languages, including English, French, German, Swahili, Arabic and Chinese. The major portion of the book is dedicated to laying down the reformist advocacy of Swami Dayanand with the last four chapters making a case for comparative study of different religious faiths.

The book

Overview 

During the Middle Ages of Indian history, many faiths and sects sprang up in religious and social spheres of Hindu society. Their practitioners slowly migrated away from the teachings of the Vedas attaching greater significance to their founders and their preachings. From then onwards polytheism commenced. Great differences developed among the different sects and divided and weakened Hindu society. The caste system based on birth became strong and gave rise to further fragmentation. Like with any aging society without reforms, the customs gave way to superstition and ignorance wherein practice superseded reason and the spread of blind faith threatened degradation of "Hindu" society. Saraswati argues that the word Hindu is an improper word or misnomer- the correct word is Vaidic Dharma or Sanathana Dharma, a religion based upon the Vedas. The word Hindu does not appear anywhere in the Vedic texts or even the Bhagavad Gita. The word Hindu is a Persian word, used by the Muslims and the renaming of the Vaidic religion to "Hindu" demonstrates the level of weakening to the Vaidic faith. "Hinduism" needs reforms.

It was at this time that Swami Dayanand wrote Satyarth Prakash in order to spread the knowledge of the Vedas. The Satyarth Prakash contains exposition and clarifications of Vedic principles. The book advocates the three eternal entities based on the Vedas:

1. Prakṛti or Nature, which is the material cause for the Creation, is eternal and is characterised by Sattva (Pure existence), Rajas (Rajah means to shine, light or Atomic or that conveys information about existence) and Tamas (Existence unknowable in its form), which tend to be in equilibrium. In every cycle of creation, the Conscious Supreme Lord will disturb its equilibrium and makes it useful for the creation of the Worlds and its forces and to manufacture the bodies required by the individual souls. After a specific long time called the day of the Brahma (Brahma means great, lengthy etc...), the creation will be dissolved and the Nature is restored back to its equilibrium. After a period called the Night of Brahma, which is equal to the length of the day of the Brahma, the Creation will set forth again. This cycle of creation and dissolution has neither beginning nor nor end, hence the characteristic of the eternal.

2. Jiva or Individual eternal Souls who are different from one another yet have the same characteristics and can reach the same level of Happiness in the state of Moksha or Liberation (explained below in another paragraph). They are bodiless hence beyond all genders and all other characteristics as seen in the World, they are not made out of materials of Nature, and they are subtler than the Nature itself, but take birth through body as per the creative principles set by the Supreme Lord based on their past Karma and they put effort to improve themselves. By realising oneself, the Nature and the Supreme Lord, individual souls are liberated. But this realisation depends on their efforts and knowledge gained. They keep coming to the World, use Nature, obtain fruits of their actions and appear taking myriads of lives of different animals (It is not a one way direction but those who have attained higher intellectual bodies can also go back to lower forms based on their Karma or actions), they redo their actions and are completely free to choose their actions, learn and relearn, attain Liberation and after the extensive long duration of Moksha or Liberation, will come back again into the World. Since this period of Moksha or Liberation is extremely long, it appears as though they never return or they never take birth again by the other beings who are still in the World. Since they are eternal and are capable of working, these characteristics cannot be destroyed. They are timeless, eternal but are not All-Knowers and they cannot be the pervaders of entire Space. Hence however much they know and experience and enjoy is always limited and yet unexplored always remains.

3. One Supreme Lord who goes by the name Om, is also an abbreviation of several of the supreme qualities, who is the efficient cause of the Universe. Lord's Chief characteristics being - Sat, Chit and Ananda i.e., "It Exists", has "Supreme Consciousness" and is "Eternally Blissful". The Lord and his characteristics are the same. The Lord is the eternal truth itself and the very giver of bliss enjoyed by the individual souls. The Supreme Lord is ever present everywhere, beyond the Nature or Prakriti, and pervades all the individual souls and the Nature also and The Supreme Lord will not take birth or incarnate. The Supreme Lord is bodiless,  has no form and hence cannot be worshipped through idols but can only be reached by every being through Yogic Samadhi as advocated in the Vedas which is summarised in the Yoga Sutras of Patanjali. Since the Lord is bodiless and hence beyond all genders, the Vedas address it as Father, Mother, Friend, Cause of the Worlds, Maker etc... It is Infinite and is the subtlest entity which is subtler than Nature and all the other conscious individual souls. So, the Lord is the subtlest pervader of the all Space, beyond time, eternally blissful and knower of all. Since the Lord is beyond the Nature and not made out of Nature, and subtle, could he grasp the Nature to create the Worlds and proposes no difficulty for the motion of the Worlds in Space. Hence he is called Paramatman, which means 'Ultimate Pervader". Hence there neither who is equal to him nor completely opposed to him. The idea of Ghosts etc. are foreign to the Vedas.

Moksha or State of Liberation: Moksha does not refer to any characteristic place but it is the state of individual souls who have achieved Liberation. The Jivas or individual souls are characterised by different states of existence which are: 1. Jagrat (Wakefulness), 2. Swapna (Dreaming), 3. Sushupti (Deep Sleep, which is quite different from other states) and 4. Turiya. It is the fourth Turiya state in which the individual souls exist without contact with the Nature but are conscious of their own selves, other individual souls and the Supreme Lord (or eternal Truth). This state of Moksha or Turiya is not seen in the World hence incomparable but can only be realised. In this state they are free of every tinge of Nature and possess their own minds experience non-worldy pleasures, the pleasure of their freedom and the like incomparable with any form of pleasure of the world. They are bodiless in that state and can attain any form of pleasure by their own will without requiring any external agent such as, for example they can perform the function of ears by their own self without requiring material ears etc. In that state they are capable fulfilling of all their wishes, can go anywhere they want right then and there, can witness the creation, maintenance and dissolution of the Worlds, the cause of suffering of beings, their actions and that which leads them to the end of their suffering. But even in that state, the creative powers remain with the Supreme Lord because the powers of the Lord and the Lord himself are not different things.

Some of the topics in the Satyarth Prakash include worship of one God, explanation of the main principles of the Vedas, the relationship between religion and science and between devotion and intellect, elimination of the caste system and critical analysis of different religious beliefs and other religions in the World in the light of the Vedas, for the strengthening of society, eradication of superstitions, false notions and meaningless customs, shunning narrow-mindedness and promoting the brotherhood of man.

Contents 

The book contains fourteen chapters.

Editions 

The book was originally written in Hindi by Maharshi Dayanand Saraswati in 1875 CE. After detecting omissions, language and printing mistakes in the first edition, after making corrections at Israr Mahal inside Ramapur at Kashi, he published a second revised edition in Samvat 1939 (1882-83 CE). The book has been translated into twenty-four different languages. Navlakha Mahal is presently the office of Shrimadd Dayanand Satyarth Prakash Nyas, which after detecting in 2004 that the book has been printed by many unauthorised entities in different versions, appointed an authentication Committee of Vedic scholars, and started to publish authenticated version of the book.

Reception and criticism 

S. Rangaswami Iyengar praised the book, saying that "It contains the wholly rationalistic view of the Vedic religion."

Satyartha Prakash was banned in some princely states and in Sindh in 1944 and is still banned in Sindh.

In 2008 two Indian Muslims, Usman Ghani and Mohammad Khalil Khan of Sadar Bazar, Delhi, following the fatwa of Mufti Mukarram Ahmed, the Imam of Fatehpuri Masjid in Delhi, urged the Delhi High Court to ban Satyarth Prakash. However, the court dismissed the petition and commented "A suit by Hindus against the Quran or by Muslims against Gita or Satyarth Prakash claiming relief... are in fact, meant to play mischief in the society."

References

Citations

External links 

 Read & download Satyarth Prakash ~ Light of Truth online in English translated by Dr. Chiranjiva Bharadwaja
 Read Satyarth Prakash online (in English, Malayalam, Hindi, German, Bengali and Urdu)
 Read Satyarth Prakash ('The Light of Truth') (in eighteen different languages)
 Satyarth Prakash at Krantikari

Hinduism in Guyana
1875 non-fiction books
19th-century Indian books
Arya Samaj
Hindu literature
Censored books
Censorship in Pakistan